Os or Os i Østerdalen is the administrative centre of Os Municipality in Innlandet county, Norway. The Os Church is located in the village.

This village is the only urban area in the municipality according to Statistics Norway.

The village lies along the County Road 30 and the Rørosbanen railway line, with a stop at Os Station.

References

Os, Innlandet
Villages in Innlandet